Bartolomé Santana (stage name, Bart Santana, Huelva, 1980) is a Spanish actor mainly known by his television roles.

He studied at the Escuela de Arte Dramático Cristina Rota, and León Ortega School of Arts.

Filmography

Television

Regular roles 
 Física o Química, Roque Madrona (2008–2010).
 Majoria absoluta, Jairo (2002–2004).
 Mujeres como Raúl (2006).

Episodic roles 
 Compañeros Willy (2001)
 Al salir de clase (2002)
 Hospital Central  (2006)
 Amar en tiempos revueltos (2006–2007)
 R.I.S. Científica Sr.Moreira(2007)
 MIR José Luis (2007)
 Cuenta atrás terrorista (2007)

Cinema 
 Tu vida en 65´ (2006) Pedro
 Mataharis (2007) Antoñito
 Che: Part Two(2008) Daniel

Short films
 Diminutos del Calvario (2002) Chico Hormonal
 Feliciten al chef (2006)  Teo

Theatre
 Mi primera vez (2010)

References

External links 

1980 births
Living people
People from Huelva
Spanish male television actors
Spanish male film actors
21st-century Spanish male actors